The Bartram Canoe Trail is a system of canoe and kayak water trails in the Mobile–Tensaw River Delta of Alabama.

Named for explorer and naturalist William Bartram, the 200-mile-long trail system is one of the longest in the United States. It includes bottomland hardwood swamp, creeks, side channel sloughs, lakes and backwaters. The system also includes Bottle Creek which is near the Bottle Creek Indian Mounds.

The trail system is operated by the Alabama Department of Conservation and Natural Resources.

Features

References

External links
 Bartram Canoe Trail at Alabama Scenic River Trail
 OutdoorAlabama.com
 CanoeKayak.com

Water trails
Protected areas of Baldwin County, Alabama